Mike Dawson (born 1975) is a British-American cartoonist, known for his work on books such as Freddie & Me, Ace-Face and Gabagool!

Early life
Dawson was born in Scotland, but his family moved to Leighton Buzzard, England when he was still an infant. They emigrated to the United States in 1986, where his family settled in Red Bank, New Jersey. He studied painting at the Mason Gross School of the Arts at Rutgers University.

Career
Between 1995 and 1998 Dawson wrote and drew a daily comic strip for his college newspaper The Daily Targum. He worked with multiple collaborators, and the strip went through a number of incarnations: Dave & Pissa, Dave & Co, and Dave’s Family.

From 2002 – 2004 he self-published the humor series Gabagool!, with co-writer Chris Radtke.

His first graphic novel, Freddie & Me: A Coming-of-Age (Bohemian) Rhapsody, was published in 2008. In it, Dawson presents a memoir of his younger days as an obsessive fan of the rock group Queen and of the band's flamboyant, charismatic, and vocally gifted lead singer, Freddie Mercury. Dawson explores how the music of Queen corresponds to significant events and meaningful time periods in his life, particularly in his youth.

A collection of short stories entitled Ace-Face: The Mod With the Metal Arms was published in 2009 by AdHouse Books.

Dawson's webcomic Troop 142 received the Ignatz Award for Outstanding Online Comic in 2010. Troop 142 was published  as a graphic novel in 2011 by Secret Acres.

Dawson is the co-host of The Ink Panthers Show!, a weekly podcast with cartoonist Alex Robinson. Guests have included Tony Consiglio, Vanessa Davis, Julia Wertz, Dylan Horrocks, Sarah Glidden, and Matt Fraction.

Dawson was also the host of a second podcast, TCJ Talkies, which appeared on The Comics Journal website biweekly. Guests included Craig Thompson, Jessica Abel, Tim Kreider, Howard Cruse, and Renee French.

Bibliography

Graphic novels
 Freddie & Me: A Coming of Age (Bohemian) Rhapsody (2008) Bloomsbury USA
 Ace Face: The Mod with the Metal Arms (2009) AdHouse Books
 Troop 142 (2011) Secret Acres
 Angie Bongiolatti (2014) Secret Acres
 Rules for Dating My Daughter (2016) Uncivilized Books

Anthologies
 The ACT-I-VATE Primer (2010) IDW
 Awesome 2: Awesomer (2009) Top Shelf Productions
 PopGun #3 (2009) Image Comics
 House of Twelve #4 (2007) House of Twelve
 Superior Showcase #1 (2006), with Dean Trippe, Nick Bertozzi, & Hope Larson. AdHouse Books
 True Porn Vol. 2 (2005) Alternative Comics
 You Ain’t No Dancer (2005) New Reliable Press
 Project: Superior (2005) AdHouse Books
 SPX Anthology (2003) Published by the Comic Book Legal Defense Fund

Awards
 Ignatz Award Nomination for Outstanding Graphic Novel (2012)
 Ignatz Award Winner for Outstanding Online Comic (2010)
 Ignatz Award Nomination for Outstanding Artist, Outstanding Series, Outstanding Minicomic (2010)
 Day Prize Nomination for "Guitar Solo" mini-comic (2006)
 Ignatz Award Nomination for Promising New Talent (2002)

References

External links

 
 
 The Ink Panthers Show

Interviews
 The Comics Journal 2011 interview
 Indie Spinner Rack 2008 audio interview with Indie Spinner Rack
 PopCandy 2008 audio interview at PopCandy, with Whitney Matheson
 Comics Reporter 2008 interview at The Comics Reporter
 BlogCritics 2008 conversation with Mike at BlogCritics Magazine
 Pop Thought Interview conducted by Alex Ness
 The Pulse Interview conducted by Jen Contino
 Your Indy Weekly Gabagool! reviewed at Newsarama

American cartoonists
British emigrants to the United States
Alternative cartoonists
1975 births
Living people
Ignatz Award winners for Outstanding Online Comic